Jean-Pierre Velly (14 September 1943, Audierne, France – 26 May 1990) was a Breton etcher, draftsman and painter.

In 1965, after attending the Ecole des Beaux Arts de Toulon, he began study at the École Nationale Supérieure des Beaux-Arts in Paris. The following year he won the "Grand Prix de Rome" for etching. In 1967 he moved to Rome for three years to work under Balthus at Villa Medici, the French Academy. From 1970 he lived at Formello, a small village near Rome, where he worked for the next twenty years.

In 1971 he began exhibiting at Rome's Don Chisciotte Gallery, and started working in  silverpoint, and painting in watercolor, particularly for the series Velly pour Corbière (1976–1978) from the poems of Tristan Corbiere, and  Bestiaire Perdu (1978–1980). In the 1980s his subjects turned to landscapes, still life, life studies, trees and self portraits; using pencil, china ink, watercolor and oil.

In 1990, he was the victim of a boating accident and drowned in Lake Bracciano; his body was never recovered.
Since then his work has been exhibited in Italy, France and Germany.

External links
Jean-Pierre Velly biographical web site www.velly.org; retrieved 10 May 2011

1943 births
1990 deaths
20th-century French painters
20th-century French male artists
French male painters
French draughtsmen
Accidental deaths in Italy
Boating accident deaths